Montebello Vicentino is a town and comune in the province of Vicenza, Veneto, northern Italy. It is west of the SP31 provincial road.

Sources
(Google Maps)

Cities and towns in Veneto